Detour (translit. Otklonenie) is a 1967 Bulgarian drama film directed by Grisha Ostrovski and Todor Stoyanov. It was entered into the 5th Moscow International Film Festival where it won the Special Golden Prize and the Prix FIPRESCI.

Cast
 Nevena Kokanova as Neda
 Ivan Andonov as Boyan
 Katya Paskaleva as Vera
 Stefan Ilyev as Kosta
 Dorotea Toncheva as Pavlina
 Tzvetana Galabova as Lili ot muzeya
 Lyuben Zhelyazkov as Priyatelyat ot kafeneto
 Dora Markova as Selyankata s praskovite
 Svetoslav Peev as Asistentat
 Dimitar Lalov as Zaekvashtiyat
 Nikolai Ouzounov as Yacho
 Nencho Yovchev as Varadin

References

External links
 

1967 films
1967 drama films
Bulgarian drama films
1960s Bulgarian-language films
Bulgarian black-and-white films